William Wallace Hozier, 1st Baron Newlands  (24 February 1825 – 30 January 1906), known as Sir William Hozier, Bt, between 1890 and 1898, was a Scottish soldier and businessman.

Background
Hozier was the son of James Hozier, of Mauldslie Castle and Newlands, Lanarkshire, and Catherine Margaret, daughter of Sir William Feilden, 1st Baronet. Sir Henry Montague Hozier, father of Clementine Churchill, was his younger brother.

Career
Hozier served in the Royal Scots Greys and achieved the rank of lieutenant. He later became a Captain in the Lanarkshire Regiment and a Lieutenant-Colonel in the 4th Battalion of the Lanarkshire Rifle Volunteers and the Auxiliary Forces. He was a Director of Caledonian Railway Company as well as a Justice of the Peace for Glasgow and Argyll, a Deputy Lieutenant of Glasgow and Vice-Lord-Lieutenant of Lanarkshire. He was created a Baronet, of Newlands and Mauldslie in the County of Lanark, in 1890 and raised to the peerage as Baron Newlands, of Newlands and Barrowfield in the County of the City of Glasgow and of Mauldslie Castle in the County of Lanark, in 1898. He is only recorded to have spoken once in the House of Lords, in June 1901.

Family
Lord Newlands married Frances Anne, daughter of John O'Hara, in 1849. They had one son and three daughters. She died in January 1891. Newlands remained a widower until his death in January 1906, aged 80. He was succeeded in his titles by his only son, James. His youngest daughter, Mary Houghton Hozier, married Charles Cochrane-Baillie, 2nd Baron Lamington.

External links
Portrait of Lord Newlands at the National Portrait Gallery

References

1825 births
1906 deaths
Barons in the Peerage of the United Kingdom
Deputy Lieutenants of Glasgow
Deputy Lieutenants of Lanarkshire
Directors of the Caledonian Railway
Scottish justices of the peace
Peers of the United Kingdom created by Queen Victoria